Radio Cadena Nacional may refer to:

RCN Radio, a Colombian radio network
RCN TV, a Colombian television network

See also
Cadena nacional, a national network in several Latin American countries
RCN (disambiguation)